Fairview Elementary School can refer to:
 Fairview Elementary School in Fairview, Anchorage
Fairview Elementary School in Fairview, Utah
 Fairview Elementary School, part of the Hayward Unified School District in Hayward, California
 Fairview Elementary School, part of Adams County School District 50 in Denver, Colorado
 Fairview Elementary School in Middletown Township, New Jersey
 Fairview Elementary School in Fairfax Station, Virginia
 Fairview Elementary School, formerly part of Darien School District 61 in Darien, Illinois
 Fairview Elementary School in Mississauga, Ontario